Mark Sitch (born 28 October 1975 in Australia) is an Australian-born Scottish former rugby union footballer who played for Glasgow Warriors and Glasgow Hawks. He could play at either flanker or number eight.

Rugby Union career

Amateur career

Sitch played for Glasgow Hawks.

He was part of cup-winning side that won the BT Cup in May 2004.

He won the Premiership Player of the Year trophy for that season 2003-04.

In 2016, Sitch turned out for a Hawks Legends side.

Professional career

Sitch played two competitive matches for Glasgow Warriors in the season 2003-04.

Coaching career

Sitch went on to coach Allan Glens.

References

External links
Pro12 biography

1975 births
Living people
Australian rugby union players
Scottish rugby union coaches
Scottish rugby union players
Glasgow Warriors players
Glasgow Hawks players
Rugby union flankers